Hitesh Sharma (born 30 April 1968) is an Indian former cricketer. He played six first-class matches for Delhi between 1991 and 1994.

See also
 List of Delhi cricketers

References

External links
 

1968 births
Living people
Indian cricketers
Delhi cricketers
Cricketers from Delhi